In physics, the Spalart–Allmaras model is a one-equation model that solves a modelled transport equation for the kinematic eddy turbulent viscosity. The Spalart–Allmaras model was designed specifically for aerospace applications involving wall-bounded flows and has been shown to give good results for boundary layers subjected to adverse pressure gradients. It is also gaining popularity in turbomachinery applications.

In its original form, the model is effectively a low-Reynolds number model, requiring the viscosity-affected region of the boundary layer to be properly resolved ( y+ ~1 meshes). 
The Spalart–Allmaras model was developed for aerodynamic flows. It is not calibrated for general industrial flows, and does produce relatively larger errors for some free shear flows, especially plane and round jet flows. In addition, it cannot be relied on to predict the decay of homogeneous, isotropic turbulence.

It solves a transport equation for a viscosity-like variable . This may be referred to as the Spalart–Allmaras variable.

Original model 
The turbulent eddy viscosity is given by

The rotation tensor is given by

The constants are

Modifications to original model 
According to Spalart it is safer to use the following values for the last two constants:

Other models related to the S-A model:

DES (1999) 

DDES (2006)

Model for compressible flows 
There are two approaches to adapting the model for compressible flows. In the first approach, the turbulent dynamic viscosity is computed from

where  is the local density.

where the right hand side (RHS) is the same as in the original model.

Boundary conditions 
Walls: 

Freestream:

Ideally , but some solvers can have problems with a zero value, in which case  can be used.

This is if the trip term is used to "start up" the model.  A convenient option is to set  in the freestream.  The model then provides "Fully Turbulent" behavior, i.e., it becomes turbulent in any region that contains shear.

Outlet: convective outlet.

References 

 Spalart, P. R. and Allmaras, S. R., 1992, "A One-Equation Turbulence Model for Aerodynamic Flows" AIAA Paper 92-0439

External links 

 This article was based on the Spalart-Allmaras model article in CFD-Wiki
 What Are the Spalart-Allmaras Turbulence Models? from kxcad.net
 The Spalart-Allmaras Turbulence Model at NASA's Langley Research Center Turbulence Modelling Resource site

Turbulence models